Walter Hinshelwood (27 October 1929 – 26 November 2018) was an English footballer who was active in the 1950s. His position on the pitch was outside-right. Hinshelwood began his career at Fulham, where he received little playing time. In January 1951, he was transferred to Chelsea, but returned to Fulham within four months.

In 1952, Hinshelwood joined Reading, where he became a first-team regular. He was selected to play for the Third Division South representative side in 1954–55. Four years later, he moved to Bristol City where he played another four years before finishing his career with short spells at Millwall and Newport County.

Wally Hinshelwood is also the patriarch of the Hinshelwood football family. His sons Martin and Paul both went on to become professional footballers at Crystal Palace. Martin had to retire early because of injury, and is director of football at Brighton & Hove Albion, while Paul became an England under-21 international and played more than 300 games for Palace. Wally's grandsons Danny, Adam and Paul have also played professional football.

External links
Career stats
Profile at citystats.org.uk

1929 births
2018 deaths
English footballers
Fulham F.C. players
Chelsea F.C. players
Reading F.C. players
Bristol City F.C. players
Millwall F.C. players
Newport County A.F.C. players
Association football midfielders
Footballers from Lambeth